Johannes Stark (15 April 1874 – 21 June 1957) was a German physicist who was awarded the Nobel Prize in Physics in 1919 "for his discovery of the Doppler effect in canal rays and the splitting of spectral lines in electric fields". This phenomenon is known as the Stark effect.

Stark received his Ph.D. in physics from the University of Munich in 1897 under the supervision of Eugen von Lommel, and served as Lommel's assistant until his appointment as a lecturer at the University of Göttingen in 1900. He was an extraordinary professor at Leibniz University Hannover from 1906 until he became a professor at RWTH Aachen University in 1909. In 1917, he became professor at the University of Greifswald, and he also worked at the University of Würzburg from 1920 to 1922.

A supporter of Adolf Hitler from 1924, Stark was one of the main figures, along with fellow Nobel laureate Philipp Lenard, in the anti-Semitic Deutsche Physik movement, which sought to remove Jewish scientists from German physics. He was appointed head of the German Research Foundation in 1933 and was president of the Reich Physical-Technical Institute from 1933 to 1939. In 1947 he was found guilty as a "Major Offender" by a denazification court.

Biography

Early years
Born in Schickenhof, Kingdom of Bavaria (now Freihung), Stark was educated at  Bayreuth Gymnasium (secondary school) and later in Regensburg. His collegiate education began at the University of Munich, where he studied physics, mathematics, chemistry, and crystallography. His tenure at that college began in 1894; he graduated in 1897, with his doctoral dissertation titled Untersuchung über einige physikalische, vorzüglich optische Eigenschaften des Rußes  (Investigation of some physical, in particular optical properties of soot).

Career
Stark worked in various positions at the Physics Institute of his alma mater until 1900, when he became an unsalaried lecturer at the University of Göttingen. An extraordinary professor at Hannover by 1906, in 1908 he became professor at RWTH Aachen University. He worked and researched at physics departments of several universities, including the University of Greifswald, until 1922. In 1919, he won the Nobel Prize in Physics for his "discovery of the Doppler effect in canal rays and the splitting of spectral lines in electric fields" (the latter is known as the Stark effect). From 1933 until his retirement in 1939, Stark was elected President of the Physikalisch-Technische Reichsanstalt, while also President of the Deutsche Forschungsgemeinschaft.

It was Stark who, as the editor of the Jahrbuch der Radioaktivität und Elektronik, asked in 1907, then still rather unknown, Albert Einstein to write a review article on the principle of relativity. Stark seemed impressed by relativity and Einstein's earlier work when he quoted "the principle of relativity formulated by H. A. Lorentz and A. Einstein" and "Planck's relationship M0 = E0/c2" in his 1907 paper in Physikalische Zeitschrift, where he used the equation e0 = m0c2 to calculate an "elementary quantum of energy", i.e. the amount of energy related to the mass of an electron at rest. While working on his article, Einstein began a line of thought that would eventually lead to his generalized theory of relativity, which in turn became (after its confirmation) the start of Einstein's worldwide fame. This is ironic, given Stark's later work as an anti-Einstein and anti-relativity propagandist in the Deutsche Physik movement.

Stark published more than 300 papers, mainly regarding electricity and other such topics. He received various awards, including the Nobel Prize, the Baumgartner Prize of the Vienna Academy of Sciences (1910), the Vahlbruch Prize of the Göttingen Academy of Sciences (1914), and the Matteucci Medal of the Rome Academy. Probably his best known contribution to the field of physics is the Stark effect, which he discovered in 1913.  In 1970 the International Astronomical Union honored him with a crater on the far-side of the moon, without knowing about his Nazi activities. The name was dropped on August 12, 2020.

He married Luise Uepler, and they had five children.  His hobbies were the cultivation of fruit trees and forestry. He worked in his private laboratory, which he set up using his Nobel prize money, on his country estate in Upper Bavaria after the second world war.  There he studied the deflection of light in an electric field.

Affiliation with Nazism

From 1924 onwards, Stark supported Hitler. During the Nazi regime, Stark attempted to become the Führer of German physics through the Deutsche Physik ("German physics") movement (along with fellow Nobel laureate Philipp Lenard) against the "Jewish physics" of Albert Einstein and Werner Heisenberg (who was not Jewish). After Werner Heisenberg defended Albert Einstein's theory of relativity, Stark wrote an angry article in the official SS newspaper Das Schwarze Korps, calling Heisenberg a "White Jew".

On August 21, 1934, Stark wrote to physicist and fellow Nobel laureate Max von Laue, telling him to toe the party line or suffer the consequences. The letter was signed off with "Heil Hitler."

In his 1934 book Nationalsozialismus und Wissenschaft (English: "National Socialism and Science") Stark maintained that the priority of the scientist was to serve the nation—thus, the important fields of research were those that could help German arms production and industry.  He attacked theoretical physics as "Jewish" and stressed that scientific positions in Nazi Germany should only be held by pure-blooded Germans.

Writing in Das Schwarze Korps, Stark argued that even if racial antisemitism were to triumph, it would only be a 'partial victory' if 'Jewish' ideas were not similarly defeated: "We also have to eradicate the Jewish spirit, whose blood can flow just as undisturbed today as before if its carriers hold beautiful Aryan passes".

In 1947, following the defeat of Germany in World War II, Stark was classified as a "Major Offender" and received a sentence of four years' imprisonment (later suspended) by a denazification court.

Later life and death

Stark spent the last years of his life on his Gut Eppenstatt near Traunstein in Upper Bavaria, where he died in 1957 at the age of 83. He was buried in Schönau am Königssee in the mountain cemetery.

See also
Stark-Einstein law

Publications
 Die Entladung der Elektricität von galvanisch glühender Kohle in verdünntes Gas.  (Sonderabdruck aus 'Annalen der Physik und Chemie', Neue Folge, Band 68). Leipzig, 1899
 Der elektrische Strom zwischen galvanisch glühender Kohle und einem Metall durch verdünntes Gas. (Sonderabdruck aus 'Annalen der Physik und Chemie', Neue Folge, Band 68). Leipzig, 1899
 Aenderung der Leitfähigkeit von Gasen durch einen stetigen elektrischen Strom. (Sonderabdruck aus 'Annalen der Physik', 4. Folge, Band 2). Leipzig, 1900
 Ueber den Einfluss der Erhitzung auf das elektrische Leuchten eines verdünnten Gases. (Sonderabdruck aus 'Annalen der Physik', 4. Folge, Band 1). Leipzig, 1900
 Ueber elektrostatische Wirkungen bei der Entladung der Elektricität in verdünnten Gasen. (Sonderabdruck aus 'Annalen der Physik', 4. Folge, Band 1). Leipzig, 1900
 Kritische Bemerkungen zu der Mitteilung der Herren Austin und Starke über Kathodenstrahlreflexion. Sonderabdruck aus 'Verhandlungen der Deutschen Physikalischen Gesellschaft', Jahrgang 4, Nr. 8). Braunschweig,  1902
 Prinzipien der Atomdynamik. 1. Teil. Die elektrischen Quanten., 1910
 Schwierigkeiten für die Lichtquantenhypothese im Falle der Emission von Serienlinien. (Sonderabdruck aus 'Verhandlungen der Deutschen Physikalischen Gesellschaft', Jg. XVI, Nr 6). Braunschweig, 1914
 Bemerkung zum Bogen – und Funkenspektrum des Heliums. (Sonderabdruck aus 'Verhandlungen der Deutschen Physikalischen Gesellschaft.', Jg. XVI, Nr. 10). Braunschweig, 1914
 Folgerungen aus einer Valenzhypothese. III. Natürliche Drehung der Schwingungsebene des Lichtes. (Sonderabdruck aus `Jahrbuch der Radioaktivität und Elektronik', Heft 2, Mai 1914), Leipzig, 1914
 Methode zur gleichzeitigen Zerlegung einer Linie durch das elektrische und das magnetische Feld. (Sonderabdruck aus 'Verhandlungen der Deutschen Physikalischen Gesellschaft.', Jg. XVI, Nr. 7). Braunschweig, 1914
 Die gegenwärtige Krise der deutschen Physik, ("The Thoroughgoing Crisis in German Physics")  1922
 Natur der chemischen Valenzkräfte, 1922
 Hitlergeist und Wissenschaft, 1924 together with Philipp Lenard
 Die Axialität der Lichtemission und Atomstruktur, Berlin 1927
 Atomstruktur und Atombindung, A. Seydel, Berlin 1928
 Atomstrukturelle Grundlagen der Stickstoffchemie., Leipzig, 1931
 Nationalsozialismus und Katholische Kirche, ("National Socialism and the Catholic Church") 1931
 Nationalsozialismus und Katholische Kirche. II. Teil: Antwort auf Kundgebungen der deutschen Bischöfe., 1931
 Nationale Erziehung, 1932
 Nationalsozialismus und Wissenschaft ("National Socialism and Science") 1934
 
 Physik der Atomoberfläche, 1940
 Jüdische und deutsche Physik, ("Jewish and German Physics") with Wilhelm Müller, written at the University of Munich in 1941
 Nationale Erziehung, Zentrumsherrschaft und Jesuitenpolitik, undated
 Hitlers Ziele und Persönlichkeit ("Hitler's Aims and Personality"), undated

Notes

References
 Andreas Kleinert: "Die Axialität der Lichtemission und Atomstruktur". Johannes Starks Gegenentwurf zur Quantentheorie. In: Astrid Schürmann, Burghard Weiss (Eds.): Chemie – Kultur – Geschichte. Festschrift für Hans-Werner Schütt anlässlich seines 65. Geburtstages. Berlin u. Diepholz 2002, pp. 213–222.

External links

 Pictures of a Danish translation of Stark's Adolf Hitler: Aims and Personality
 Klaus Hentschel (ed.) Physics and National Socialism. An Anthology of Primary Sources., Birkhäuser-Verlag, Basel, 1996; 2. Aufl. 2011, .
 
  including the Nobel Lecture, June 3, 1920 Structural and Spectral Changes of Chemical Atoms

1874 births
1957 deaths
20th-century German physicists
German Nobel laureates
Ludwig Maximilian University of Munich alumni
Optical physicists
Nazis
Nobel laureates in Physics
People from Amberg-Sulzbach
People from the Kingdom of Bavaria
Relativity critics
Spectroscopists
Academic staff of the University of Göttingen
Academic staff of the University of Greifswald
Academic staff of the University of Hanover
Academic staff of the University of Würzburg
Recipients of the Matteucci Medal
Academic staff of RWTH Aachen University